Nahuel Milton Barragán (born 20 February 1996) is an Argentine professional footballer who plays as a forward.

Career
Barragán's career started with Argentinos Juniors, having joined them in 2006. He was an unused substitute once in their title-winning campaign of 2016–17 against Boca Unidos, as they won promotion to the Primera División. On 13 July 2018, Primera B Nacional side Olimpo loaned Barragán. However, he returned to his parent club five months later without featuring. In the succeeding January, Barragán agreed a loan move to Primera B Metropolitana's Flandria. Eleven appearances came in 2018–19, with his first match for the Jáuregui outfit coming in a four-goal victory on the road against All Boys on 29 January.

Career statistics
.

References

External links

1996 births
Living people
Sportspeople from Buenos Aires Province
People from General Rodríguez Partido
Argentine footballers
Association football forwards
Primera B Metropolitana players
Argentinos Juniors footballers
Olimpo footballers
Flandria footballers